Stefan Dichev (February 9, 1920; Veliko Tarnovo – January 27, 1996; Sofia) was a Bulgarian writer and prolific author. Lawyer by education.

Dichev is best known for his historical novels. He wrote the screenplay for the famous film "The way to Sofia" dedicated to the 100th anniversary of the Liberation of Bulgaria.

References

Bulgarian writers
Bulgarian historical fiction writers
Bulgarian screenwriters
Male screenwriters
Sofia University alumni
1920 births
1996 deaths